The  Bank of America Roval  400 is a NASCAR Cup Series race that is held annually at Charlotte Motor Speedway in Concord, North Carolina, United States, with the other one being the Coca-Cola 600 on Memorial Day weekend, the  race.

As of the 2018 season, the event is run as a 400 kilometer (248.5 mi) race using the infield road course configuration the track calls "The Roval"; previously, the race was run at a distance of 500 miles using the regular oval. Christopher Bell is the defending winner of the event.

History

The race had been a Sunday afternoon event until 2002. That year rain delayed the start by over 3 hours, meaning much of the race was run under the lights. Thanks in large part to the ratings boost NBC received in primetime hours, NASCAR made a decision to move the race date from Sunday afternoon to Saturday night from 2003 to 2016. NBC retained their rights to broadcast the race, unlike in most of the night events aired in their part of the season's contract which normally aired on TNT. With the move, then-Lowe's Motor Speedway became one of only two tracks in NASCAR to have two-night dates on the schedule.

In 2015 and 2016, the races on Saturday night were canceled due to bad weather, so they were run on Sunday afternoon. In 2017, at the time of the schedule announcement, the race was scheduled for Saturday night. On April 20, the race was rescheduled for Sunday and moved from a night race to a day race. At the 2017 event, after rain caused the Xfinity Series event of the Saturday afternoon to be delayed by several hours, a decision was made to move the Cup race an hour back to a 1:00 PM local time start, as more rain was expected later during the day. The race eventually concluded successfully after 3 and a half hours without the occurrence of any rain delays.

Ryan Blaney would win the inaugural Roval Cup race after Martin Truex Jr. and Jimmie Johnson collided on the final lap.

Realignment
In 2020, the Bank of America Roval 400 was moved from late September to the middle of October and beheld as the final race of the Round of 12; the Bass Pro Shops NRA Night Race at Bristol Motor Speedway took Charlotte's former spot. Although rain was present, the 2020 races were run without any delays as cars continued in the wet with limited lighting, as was the case in the Xfinity race.

Past winners

Notes
1971: Shortened due to rain.
1999: Postponed from Sunday to Monday due to rain.

2005, 2007, 2017, and 2022: Race extended due to a NASCAR Overtime finish.
2015, 2016, and 2017: Race postponed from Saturday night to Sunday afternoon due to rain.( 2017 was just rescheduled)

Race records
Oval – 1964Race time: 2:58:35Average Speed: 

Oval – 1999Race time: 3:07:31Average Speed: 

Roval – 2022Race Time: 2:59:54Average Speed:

Multiple winners (drivers)

Multiple winners (teams)

Manufacturer wins

Notable races

1964: Fred Lorenzen took lead with two laps to go after Richard Petty, who led 188 laps, blew a tire and crashed.  Paul Goldsmith led 71 laps before blowing his engine.
1965: Lorenzen won for the second straight year after a wild three-abreast battle with Curtis Turner and Dick Hutcherson for first.   The race was a tragic affair as a massive crash claimed the life of Harold Kite.
1970: Leeroy Yarbrough took what turned out to be his final Grand National win.
1971: Bobby Allison in the Holman-Moody Mercury battled Charlie Glotzbach, driving the Chevrolet Monte Carlo fielded by track president Richard Howard.  Allison took the lead on Lap 177 and led when rain shortened the race at Lap 238. Leeroy Yarbrough drove a second Howard Chevrolet, reuniting with team manager Junior Johnson, for whom Leeroy had driven earlier than the 1971 season.
1973: Controversies plagued the weekend.  Charlie Glotzbach won the pole in Hoss Ellington's Chevrolet but NASCAR discovered a moveable restrictor-plate after qualifying and put Glotzbach to the back of the field.  Buddy Baker was pulled out of the race 228 laps in by team owner Nord Krauskopf when NASCAR said it wanted to reinspect the #71 Dodge after the race.  David Pearson and Glotzbach crashed 40 laps in, leaving Petty, Cale Yarborough, and Bobby Allison in charge.   Yarborough and Petty put Allison three laps down en route to the 1-2 finish.   But following the race controversy ensued over the post race inspection of the top three cars; Allison's Chevy cleared after one hour but six hours after the inspection NASCAR announced the results for Yarborough's #11 would receive further study, and Allison claimed to have seen Petty's team remove the air filter from the car before it could be inspected; track promoter Richard Howard threatened a lawsuit if the race results were changed.  Allison claimed the top two finishers were illegal and threatened to sue NASCAR; Petty asserted only three of his engine's eight cylinders were checked; a later meeting between Allison and Bill France Jr. settled the controversy.
1974: The race set an event record for lead changes at 47.  David Pearson lost two laps 150 miles in but made up the deficit and surged to the win. The race was marred by a ten-car crash in which Marty Robbins suffered serious facial injuries, a two-car crash involving Grant Adcox and Ramo Stott, and a pit fire in Richard Petty's pit.
1975: Petty took the win for a season sweep at Charlotte.  The 500 was the final race for track under the promotion of Richard Howard as Bruton Smith would take control of the speedway the following January.
1976: Donnie Allison surprised the field by winning, his first Winston Cup win since 1971 and the first for team owner Hoss Ellington.  The engine measured slightly over the 358 cubic inch limit; after a lengthy discussion, the engine was allowed to cool down and it measured below 358 cubic inches; Ellington quipped, "This one's legal.  We left all the cheater stuff at Darlington."
1978: Bobby Allison broke out of a competitive race to winning handily.  The lead changed 40 times.  David Pearson won the pole, his 11th straight Charlotte pole.
1980: Dale Earnhardt edged Buddy Baker and Cale Yarborough and solidified his point lead over Yarborough with three races to go in the season.  The win was Earnhardt's fifth of his second career Winston Cup season.  The weekend was dominated by a controversy between Darrell Waltrip and the DiGard Racing team as Waltrip announced he was leaving the team after the season despite threats of legal action by team owners the Gardner brothers to retain him.  Waltrip spun out after breaking a sway bar piece, then fell out with engine failure, angrily demanding afterward he needed to "get away from these Gardners."
1981: Darrell Waltrip's late-season victory surge included leading the final 61 laps of 1981 500.  Bobby Allison finished second and after leading the series in August was now trailing by 58 laps.  Harry Gant led Lap 3 before his engine erupted in the first turn.
1982 Gant broke through to his first superspeedway win as he edged Bill Elliott in a ten-lap showdown after Bobby Allison, who led 280 laps, blew his engine.  A ten-car crash erupted when Dale Earnhardt hooked Richard Petty into a spin.
1983: The race was marred by controversy involving an outsized engine for race winner Richard Petty as well as suspicion about runner-up Darrell Waltrip; Petty was subsequently fined $35,000 and 104 NASCAR points.
1985: Cale Yarborough lost a lap on five separate occasions and made them up all five times for his final NASCAR win.
1993: Ernie Irvan led race-record 328 laps for his second win with Robert Yates.  NASCAR shaved spoiler size to five inches and raised the front air dam a few inches out of concern for escalating track speeds and believing, following driver lobbying, that reducing downforce would force drivers to slow down for the turns.  The change did not reduce speeds.
1994: Dale Jarrett stole the win after engine failure eliminated Geoff Bodine and a late crash eliminated Ricky Rudd and Jeff Gordon; the win was Jarrett's final win with Joe Gibbs Racing.
1996: Terry Labonte dominated and erased a point gap of over 100 to Jeff Gordon, who fell out with engine failure.  The race was marred by a brutal multi-car crash involving Ernie Irvan when Irvan spun out and was center-punched by John Andretti.
2000: Bobby Labonte broke out of a fierce fight with Dale Earnhardt, Ricky Rudd, and Jeremy Mayfield to grab the win.   The weekend was marred by a sudden shortage of tires available from Goodyear, but the race went with no problems with tires.  The lead changed 46 times, the first Charlotte race to break 40 lead changes since 1988.
2002: Subbing for injured regular Sterling Marlin, Jamie McMurray grabbed his first win in his second career NASCAR start.  A major crash erupted in the trioval and brought out a furious response from team owner Richard Childress.
2005: For weeks leading up to the race, and coming off the caution-filled Coca-Cola 600 that saw a NASCAR-record 22 cautions due to the levigating of the track's surface, they levigated the rest of the oval. This led to more grip and increased speeds that weighed heavy on the tread of the tires. During the race, drivers were on edge with tire issues that plagued the Xfinity event the night before and it continued in the Cup event. It was marred by 15 cautions that were mostly for someone having a right-front tire go down and slam straight into the wall on the right side every 25-30 laps no matter how much they backed down. Around lap 200 a competition caution was thrown, and there was worry that with all the tire issues, the race would be truncated, although it did go the distance. Jimmie Johnson started in the back, and despite a tire rub late in the race while taking the lead, held off Kurt Busch and Greg Biffle in an overtime finish to score his fourth-consecutive win at Charlotte with sweeps of the events in 2004 and 2005. Becoming the first driver to win four races in a row since Dale Earnhardt Jr. at Talladega Superspeedway from October 2001 to April 2003.
2018: After a late-race caution of the inaugural Roval event, Jimmie Johnson made gains on Martin Truex Jr. in the final two laps. Coming to the final chicane on the final lap, Johnson tries to pass Truex Jr. but he lost control of his car, sending it spinning into the chicane and taking out Truex Jr. With both of them taken out, Ryan Blaney overtakes both Johnson and Truex Jr. coming out of the final chicane to earn his first win of the season with a last-lap pass. With Johnson spinning out and finishing 8th, that put him, Kyle Larson, and Aric Almirola in a three-way tie for the cut-line position in the first round of the Playoffs. As most of the field crosses the line, Daniel Hemric spun Jeffrey Earnhardt exiting the final chicane, with Jeffrey's car ended up hitting the outside wall. He corrected his car but ended up stalling mere meters before the finish line, enabling Larson to pass him in a badly-damaged car and give Larson the extra point he needed to bump Johnson out of the Playoffs.
2019: Chase Elliott returned from locking up his brakes and colliding head-on with the turn 1 barrier to win his second road course win of the year.
2020: For the first time in NASCAR Cup Series history, the Cup cars raced in the rain when they declared a wet start for the green flag. Forecast to be a rainy day, the sun came out and remained mostly cloudy, defying the forecast. At the end of Stage 1, drivers decided to forego the treaded tires for the traditional slicks for the rest of the event. Chase Elliott, the defending race winner came down pit road for a loose left front wheel. Just like last year he made his way to the front and pulled away on his way to the win. The win gave him the distinction of just the second driver to win four-straight road-course events with the other being Jeff Gordon. Multiple drivers adjusting to slicks on the damp surface created unpredictable outcomes with cars slipping off track, kicking up grass and spray from standing water.

References

External links
 
 

1960 establishments in North Carolina
Bank of America
 
NASCAR Cup Series races
Recurring sporting events established in 1960
Annual sporting events in the United States